Blanca Paloma Ramos Baeza (born 9 June 1989), also known as her given name, Blanca Paloma, is a Spanish singer, set designer and costume designer. She will represent Spain with the song "Eaea" at the Eurovision Song Contest 2023 in Liverpool, United Kingdom, after winning Benidorm Fest 2023.

Early life and education 
She was born and raised in Elche. After graduating from Miguel Hernández University of Elche with a Bachelor of Fine Arts degree, Ramos moved to Madrid to pursue a career in theatre in 2013.

Career 
On 10 December 2021, it was announced that she would participate in Benidorm Fest 2022 with her song "Secreto de agua". She participated in the first semi-final and qualified to the final, in 3rd place with 79 points. In the final, she came in 5th place with 61 points.

The following year, she participated in Benidorm Fest 2023 with the song "Eaea". She performed in the second semi final and qualified to the final. In the final, she came in first place with 169 points (94 points from the juries, 40 points from the televote and 35 points from the demoscopic juries), and thus  at the Eurovision Song Contest 2023 in Liverpool, United Kingdom.

Discography

Singles

References

External links 
 
 
 

Living people
21st-century Spanish singers
Benidorm Fest contestants
Benidorm Fest winners
Eurovision Song Contest entrants for Spain
Eurovision Song Contest entrants of 2023
Universal Music Group artists
1989 births